Bénodet (Breton: Benoded) is a commune in the Finistère department and administrative region of Brittany in north-western France. It lies about 16 kilometres south of Quimper. The Breton name Benoded means "mouth of the Odet".

Bénodet has a casino, a thalassotherapy centre, a cinema, a marina, a number of hotels, and several beaches. As with many coastal towns in Brittany, there are many second homes and the population increases sixfold over the summer period. Bénodet is also the site of menhirs and a church, dedicated to the 5th-century Irish saint Brigid of Kildare, which was built at the end of the 11th century and was classed as a historic monument in 1916. The neighboring town of Concarneau is home to the Tri Martolod brewery.

Population
In French the inhabitants of Bénodet are known as Bénodetois.

Events
Most events in the town take place in the summer months, as part of the town's bustling summer season. In May, the Odet yacht club organizes the Obelix Trophy, a sailing race with about 100 boats taking part over four days. Every year the commune mounts a series of Friday-evening music concerts – French pop rock group Superbus played there in 2005. A market is held in the town centre each Monday.

International relations
Bénodet is twinned with
  Torpoint, Cornwall, UK
  Antony, Cornwall, UK

See also
Communes of the Finistère department

References

External links

www.mairie-benodet.fr, Official site 
www.benodet.fr, Office Municipal de Tourisme de Bénodet

 Mayors of Finistère Association  ;

Communes of Finistère
Populated coastal places in Brittany
Port cities and towns on the French Atlantic coast